Jonas Henrique Pessalli (24 September 1990 – 12 June 2017) was a Brazilian professional footballer who played as a midfielder.

Career
Pessalli played with Grêmio Barueri on loan from Grêmio.

In October 2016, Pessalli signed with Neftchi Baku until the end of the 2016–17 season.

Death
On 12 June 2017 Pessalli lost control of his Audi A5 Sportback when going around a corner and crashed sideways against a utility pole. The crash was so strong that it tore the pole of the ground. Pessalli died on the spot because of his injuries. He was 26.

Career statistics

Club

References

External links
 ogol

1990 births
2017 deaths
Brazilian footballers
Grêmio Foot-Ball Porto Alegrense players
Grêmio Barueri Futebol players
Angers SCO players
Ligue 2 players
Azerbaijan Premier League players
Expatriate footballers in Azerbaijan
Brazilian expatriate footballers
Expatriate footballers in France
Brazilian expatriate sportspeople in France
Brazilian expatriate sportspeople in Azerbaijan
Paraná Clube players
Road incident deaths in Brazil
Association football midfielders
Neftçi PFK players